Streak is a 2008 American coming-of-age short film directed by Demi Moore, written by Kelly Fremon and Allan Loeb, and starring Brittany Snow and Rumer Willis. The film was Moore's first film as a director.

Plot
The film focuses on a young woman stuck in a life she no longer wants with gym-rat friends and obsessive behavior.  To break free, she reaches for fun in an interesting form of expression.

Cast
 Brittany Snow as Baylin
 Rumer Willis as Drea
 Sarah Wright as Ashley
 Madeline Zima as Stella

Production
Director Demi Moore's then 20-year-old daughter Rumer Willis starred in the film.  Of directing her daughter, Moore said, "The great thing is I’m seeing her mature and operate as a complete professional. And it’s giving us, I think, another opportunity to connect in a totally different way."

References

External links
 

2008 films
2008 drama films
2008 short films
2000s coming-of-age drama films
2000s English-language films
American coming-of-age drama films
American drama short films
Films directed by Demi Moore
2000s American films